Mary Elizabeth Wormeley Latimer (July 26, 1822 – January 4, 1904) was an English-American writer, both of original works and translations.

Early life
Elizabeth was born on July 26, 1822, in London.  She was the daughter of Admiral Ralph Randolph Wormeley (1785–1852) and Caroline (née Preble) Wormeley (1799–1872).  Her father, a native of Virginia, was an Admiral of the British navy, and preceding his death, resided in Boston, Massachusetts.  Among her siblings was Ariana Randolph Wormeley, who married the American lawyer and banker Daniel Sargent Curtis, and the nurse and author Katherine Prescott Wormeley.

Her paternal grandfather was James Wormeley, great-grandfather was John Randolph, attorney general for the Colony of Virginia and her grand-uncle was Edmund Randolph, the first Attorney General of the United States.  Her mother was a niece of Commodore Edward Preble, U.S. Navy.

Her sisters were Katharine Prescott Wormeley, the translator, and Ariana Randolph Wormeley Curtis (1834–1922), a writer who published the comedy entitled The Coming Woman, or the Spirit of '76 in 1870, which has been acted in public and private both in the United States and in Europe.  Ariana was married to prominent banker and patron of the arts, Daniel Sargent Curtis (1825–1908).

Education and career
She was educated by tutors and at a school in Ipswich, Massachusetts. Early travels also helped educate her.

She spent the winter of 1842 in Boston as the guest of the family of George Ticknor, and in that environment received much encouragement of her interest in literature.

The daughter resided several years in Newport, Rhode Island, and in 1856, after gaining a reputation as a writer.  After spending several years raising her children, she began writing again in 1876.

Personal life
Around 1856, she married Randolph Brandt Latimer (1821–1903) of Baltimore.  From 1856 to 1876, she devoted herself to raising a family, including:

 Caroline Wormeley Latimer (1859–1933), a doctor in Boston.
 Ralph Randolph Latimer (1862–1931)
 James Brandt Latimer (1865–1926), who worked for the Baltimore and Ohio Railroad and the Chicago, Burlington and Quincy Railroad and who married  Anne Wise Mayo (1879–1955)

Latimer died on January 4, 1904, in Baltimore, Maryland.

Works
She contributed to magazines, and published:
 Forest Hill: a Tale of Social Life in 1830-1 (3 vols., London, 1846)
 Amabel, a Family History, a novel (New York, 1853)
 Our Cousin Veronica (1856)
 Familiar Talks on Some of Shakespeare's Comedies (Boston, 1887)

A number of her works were volumes dealing popularly with contemporary European history:
 France in the Nineteenth Century (1892)  Further books followed this one on Russia, Turkey, England, Europeans in Africa and Spain.
 Italy in the Nineteenth Century and the Making of Austro-Hungary and Germany (1896)
 My Scrap Book of the French Revolution (1898)
 Judea from Cyrus to Titus; 537 B.C. - 70 A.D. (1899)
 The Last Years of the Nineteenth Century (1900)

She translated:
 Louis Ulbach, Madame Gosselin (New York, 1878)
 Louis Ulbach, The Steel Hammer (originally Le Marteau d'acier; 1888)
 Louis Ulbach, For Fifteen Years, a sequel to The Steel Hammer (originally Quinze ans de bagne; 1888)
 Ernest Renan, A History of the People of Israel (with J. H. Allen; 1888–96)
 George Sand, Nanon (1890)
 J. C. L. de Sismondi, The Italian Republics (1901)
 The Love Letters of Victor Hugo, 1820-22 (1901)
 Talks of Napoleon at St. Helena with General Baron Gourgaud (1903)

References

External links
 
 
 
 
 

1822 births
1904 deaths
American women writers
French–English translators
English emigrants to the United States
Writers from London
19th-century American translators
19th-century British women writers
19th-century British writers
Wikipedia articles incorporating text from A Woman of the Century
19th-century American women